Newtown  is a neighborhood of Palatka, Florida located west of downtown and includes portions of the central business district. The neighborhood was originally established as an African American community in the mid-1800s. Central Academy, Florida's first accredited African American high school, is located in the area.

See also

 List of African American neighborhoods

References
Pilo-taikita, A history of Palatka, Florida at Putnam County Cemeteries

African-American history of Florida
Neighborhoods in Palatka, Florida